Live at Cap D'Agde is a live album by the band King Crimson, released through the King Crimson Collectors' Club in April 1999.
Tracks 1-6 recorded at the Arena, Cap d'Agde, France, August 26, 1982.
Tracks 7-9 recorded at the Arena, Fréjus, France, August 27, 1982. The video of the complete performance was issued on VHS as "The Noise" and on DVD as part of "Neal And Jack And Me."

Track listing
All songs written by Adrian Belew, Bill Bruford, Robert Fripp and Tony Levin, except track 9 which is written by Robert Fripp

"Waiting Man" - 7:09
"Thela Hun Ginjeet" - 4:30
"Matte Kudasai" (待ってください, Please Wait for Me) - 3:58
"The Sheltering Sky" - 9:48
"Neal and Jack and Me" - 5:38
"Elephant Talk" - 4:57
"Indiscipline" - 12:31
"Heartbeat" - 4:05
"Larks' Tongues in Aspic (Part II)" - 7:50

Personnel
Robert Fripp - guitar
Adrian Belew - guitar, vocals
Tony Levin - bass guitar, Chapman stick
Bill Bruford - drums, percussion

References

1999 live albums
King Crimson Collector's Club albums